In Hong Kong, designated national security law judges are incumbent magistrates or judges who are further appointed by the Chief Executive to handle national security offence cases at various levels of the court system. Judges without the designation by the Chief Executive are not allowed to handle these cases.

Designation 
The Standing Committee of the National People's Congress of China enacted the Hong Kong national security law on 30 June 2020. Paragraph 3 of Article 44 of the law requires national security offence cases to be handle by "designated judges".

According to the law, the Chief Executive should designate judges from incumbent magistrates and judges from each level of the court system to handle national security offence cases. Prior to granting the designation, the Chief Executive may consult the Chief Justice and the Committee for Safeguarding National Security. The tenure of office as a designated judge is one year.

Moreover, the Chief Executive is required by the law to not grant the designation to those who have "made any statement or behaved in any manner endangering national security". And the designation can be withdrawn if a designated judge makes any statement or acts in any way that is considered endangering national security.

List of known judges 
The complete list of designated judges is not made available to the public as the government believes such revelation poses security threats to the designated judges. However when individual national security cases go through various legal proceedings in open court, the press and the public find out who the presiding designated judges are. Yet, those judges who have been designated but have not yet resided in open court on any national security case are not known to the public. The exact dates of the start and the end of the designation are also unknown to the public.

Here is a table of publicly known current and former designated judges and magistrates:

Retired judges

References 

Judiciary of Hong Kong